The Air Force Command is the high command of the German Air Force of the Bundeswehr as well as the staff of the Inspector of the Air Force. It was formed in 2012, as a merger of the German Air Staff (Führungsstab der Luftwaffe) with parts of the Air Force Office (Luftwaffenamt), and the Air Force Forces Command (Luftwaffenführungskommando), as part of a larger reorganization of the Bundeswehr. The headquarters of the command are in Gatow, Berlin, but some of the staff is in Köln instead.

References 

Military units and formations established in 2012
Air force commands of Germany
German Air Force